Luke McCormick may refer to:

Luke McCormick (footballer, born 1983), English footballer for Plymouth Argyle
Luke McCormick (footballer, born 1999), English footballer for Bristol Rovers